Pierre Eugène Alfred Bouillin (22 December 1905 – 11 June 1955) was a French sportsman and racing driver. He took the racing name Pierre Levegh  in memory of his uncle, a pioneering driver who died in 1904. Levegh died in the 1955 Le Mans disaster which also killed 83 spectators during the 1955 24 Hours of Le Mans automobile race.

Career
Levegh, who was born in Paris, France, was also an ice hockey and tennis player. In motorsport he competed in Formula One for the Talbot-Lago team in 1950 and 1951, starting six races, retiring in three, and scoring no points.

At Le Mans he raced for Talbot in four races, finishing fourth in 1951. In 1952, driving single-handedly, his car suffered an engine failure in the last hour of the race with a four lap lead. The failure was due to a bolt in the central crankshaft bearing having come loose many hours earlier in the race, although many fans placed the blame on driver fatigue. Levegh had refused to let his co-driver take over because he felt only he could nurse the car home. In 1953 he came in eighth, and in 1954 he was involved in an accident in the seventh hour of racing.

Death
In 1955 he was tempted away from Talbot and joined the American John Fitch in racing a Mercedes-Benz 300 SLR. During the 24 Hours of Le Mans, in the third hour of racing, while on the Tribunes Straight, the car of Mike Hawthorn cut into the pits, slowing in front of the Austin-Healey 100S of Lance Macklin.  Macklin was forced to make an evasive move away from Hawthorn, pulling across the track into the path of Levegh's faster Mercedes, which was driving just in front of Mercedes teammate Juan Manuel Fangio. Running up the side of Macklin's car, Levegh's car launched into the air, striking high on a retaining wall, disintegrating and scattering components into the crowd.  Levegh was killed when he was thrown from the car and his skull crushed by the impact. The flammable magnesium body of the Mercedes quickly ignited in the accident; the combination of the fire and flying car parts killed 83 spectators with over 100 injured. The race was continued in order to avoid a mass exodus of spectators, which would have blocked all access roads needed for use by the responding ambulances.

Though Levegh was killed, he may have saved the life of five-time Formula One world champion Fangio, who maintained that a hand-signal from Levegh to slow down, a moment before he struck Macklin's car, was the deliberate warning that had saved Fangio's life.

While Mercedes withdrew from the race as a sign of respect to the victims (and later from motor racing in general for the next 30 years), Mike Hawthorn and Ivor Bueb continued in their Jaguar to win the race.  The accident was a major contributor to changing attitudes about the acceptance of danger in motor racing and an increase in the desire to make courses safer for spectators and drivers alike. The small British firm of Bristol Cars, whose entrants achieved a 1–2–3 finish in the 2-litre class at Le Mans that year, decided to abandon racing altogether as a result of the tragedy, scrapping all but one of their racing cars.  Fitch became a safety advocate and began research into automotive safety, some of which have advanced into motorsport.

Levegh is buried in the Père Lachaise Cemetery in Paris.

Complete Formula One World Championship results
(key)

References

External links
Remember Le Mans 1955
1955 Le Mans Disaster
Pierre Levegh at motorsportmemorial.org

1905 births
1955 deaths
24 Hours of Le Mans drivers
Burials at Père Lachaise Cemetery
Filmed deaths in motorsport
French Formula One drivers
French ice hockey players
French racing drivers
French male sailors (sport)
Racing drivers who died while racing
Sport deaths in France
Racing drivers from Paris
World Sportscar Championship drivers